In and Out of Youth and Lightness is the third studio album by the American rock band Young Widows. The album was released on April 8, 2011 through Temporary Residence Limited.

The song "Future Heart" was released as a stand-alone limited edition 7" vinyl single with the B-side "Rose Window." A music video directed by Jeremy Johnstone for the song "Future Heart" was released in April 2011.

Track listing
All songs written and composed by Young Widows, all lyrics written by Evan Patterson, except "Right in the End" co-written by Patterson and Dominic Cipolla.
 "Young Rivers" – 5:45
 "Future Heart" – 3:25
 "In and Out of Lightness" – 6:27
 "Lean on the Ghost" – 6:26
 "The Muted Man" – 5:17
 "Right in the End" – 3:01
 "Miss Tambourine Wrist" – 4:14
 "White Golden Rings" – 5:49
 "In and Out of Youth" – 7:15

Personnel
In and Out of Youth and Lightness album personnel as adapted from CD liner notes.

Young Widows
 Evan Patterson – lead vocals, guitars
 Nick Thieneman – bass guitar, backing vocals
 Jeremy McMonigle – drum kit, tambourine, sleigh bells, piano, anvil, triangle

Additional musicians
 Dominic Cipolla – vocals (track 6)
 Jason Gagovski – thunder drum (track 8)
 Amber Estes – vocals (tracks 3, 4, 6, 9)
 Johnathan Glen Wood – vocals (track 4)

Production
 Kevin Ratterman – production, recording, engineering, mixing
 Young Widows – production

Artwork and packaging
 Kathleen Lolley (LolleyLand) – front and back cover art
 Evan Patterson – logo, album title and song title treatments
 Ryan Patterson (Auxiliary Design) – layout, design
 Nick Thieneman – photography

References

External links
 Kathleen Lolley's official website

2011 albums
Temporary Residence Limited albums
Young Widows albums